Great New Operating System In the Sky (GNOSIS) is a capability-based operating system that was researched during the 1970s at Tymshare, Inc. It was based on the research of Norman Hardy, Dale E. Jordan, Bill Frantz, Charlie Landau, Jay Jonekait, et al. It provided a foundation for the development of future operating systems such as KeyKOS, EROS, CapROS, and Coyotos. In 1984, McDonnell Douglas acquired Tymshare, and a year later sold GNOSIS to Key Logic, where GNOSIS was renamed KeyKOS.

References

External links
, Norman Hardy

Capability systems
Microkernel-based operating systems
Microkernels